Good Sports is an American sitcom television series that aired on the CBS network from January 10 to July 13, 1991, starring Farrah Fawcett and Ryan O'Neal. It was Fawcett's only scripted TV series after Charlie's Angels.

Synopsis
The show features the two main characters, Bobby Tannen (O'Neal), a once-famous former football player for the Green Bay Packers gone to seed and Gayle Roberts (Fawcett), an ex-Miss America, as mismatched anchors on an all-sports cable network, Mr. Downtown Bobby Tannen and Ms. Gayle Roberts. Bobby is a self-obsessed jock, constantly worried about himself and his image. Gayle is the more down to earth and level-headed of the two. Both characters were concerned with the ratings of their sports show, outwardly disliking each other but nonetheless mutually attracted.

Supporting cast
 Brian Doyle-Murray as John "Mac" MacKinney, the sport show's obsequious producer
 Lane Smith as R.J. Rappaport, the huffy cable channel owner
 Cleavant Derricks as Jeff Mussberger
 Paul Feig as Leash
 Lois Smith as Mrs. Tannend

The premiere installment also included:
 William Katt as Nick Calder
 Viveka Davis as Risa Braun
 Kareem Abdul-Jabbar as himself
 Arthur Burghardt as Stu Ramsey
 Lyle Alzado as himself
 Fred Travalena as himself
 Christine Dunford as Missy Van Johnson

Reception and cancellation
Good Sports premiered as a mid-season replacement on January 10, 1991. Reviews were generally mixed and ratings were low. After the ratings failed to improve, CBS canceled the series. The final episode, "A Class Act", aired on July 13, 1991.

Production notes
The 30-minute Brillstein-Grey production was created by Alan Zweibel and directed by Stan Lathan. The series' theme song was performed by Al Green.

Episodes

References

External links
 
 Video Clip: Good Sports introduction featuring music by Al Green (at min. 2:06)

1991 American television series debuts
1991 American television series endings
1990s American sitcoms
CBS original programming
English-language television shows
Television series about television
Television shows set in Los Angeles
Television series by Brad Grey Television
Cultural depictions of Vlade Divac